Trinity Academy Cathedral (formerly Cathedral Academy) is an 11-16 voluntary controlled Church of England secondary school. The school has places for 1050 students, and there were 968 pupils on the school roll in the school year 2020-21. The school is the only Church of England Secondary School in Wakefield.

History 
In 1953, a fire erupted at what was at the time, Thornes House, a Grammar School which contained campuses within Thornes Park. This fire was suspected to have been caused by a cigarette within the costume area controlled by the Wakefield Amateur Theatre Guild for a production of A Midsummer Night's Dream. The newer presently used buildings were constructed in 1956. In 1972, Thornes House renamed to Thornes House High School.

In 1992, it was proposed to merge Thornes House High School, which had by this point lost its sixth form status, with what was at the time, Cathedral Middle School (initially founded in 1987). This was done in order to form a Church controlled High School on the site of the former, Upon closure of Thornes House High School, the remaining campuses within Thornes Park were handed over to Wakefield College as their Sports and Fitness educational centre, with a Swimming Pool and other athletic facilities provided on-site.

On 31 August 1993, Cathedral Middle School became Cathedral High School, and remained under this name until 2007, when the school rebranded under the leadership of headmaster Paul West, as Cathedral School of the Performing Arts. In 2012, they were awarded Academy status for their Performing Arts achievements within high-school ages. It was at this time, which CAPA opened to students aged 16–18 and became renowned across the UK as one of the leading schools for Performing Arts. Once again, on 1 January 2012, the school was renamed as Cathedral Academy under the leadership of then Principal, Tay Warren.

On 1 March 2018, the school closed, and reopened with a new unique identifier number of 145579. The Department of Education website cites the reason as being a "new start", with Trinity Academy Trust being listed as the Academy Trustee, and Trinity Academy Halifax being listed as the school's Academic sponsors.

On 1 January 2021, the name of the school changed to Trinity Academy Cathedral.

Campus 
The school is set out across two floors, and has facilities such as a gymnasium and stage, which is used for the school's assemblies, CAPA Juniors performances and rehearsals and other major functions. The school also offers special technology rooms, with specialist woodworking and metalworking machines such as sandbelts, lathes, benchsaws, jig-saws and CAD-CAM machines, in addition to computer suites, including several banks of laptop computers to be used as required. The school also contains smart boards and projectors in every classroom for visual learning styles, specialist facilities for educating in Science, Resistant Materials with the aforementioned machinery, textiles, at least six different computer suites, five of which are dedicated for ICT and business classes, cooking, and another for technology usage such as CAD-CAM, as well as facilities and staffing for children with challenging behaviour. In addition, the school has an outdoor area used for both physical education and break times, consisting of two full sized tennis courts housed within cages on tarmac, the equivalent of three football fields of empty grassland in addition to a large tarmac play-area surrounding the rear of the school. 
The school contains a performance and conference centre, studio theatre, two dance studios, two drama studios, two rehearsal rooms, a singing studio, a music room, several practice rooms, a creative media suite, production design centre and also a costume workshop.

Curriculum 
Students aged 11–13 are required to learn English, Maths, Science, PE, French, History, Geography, Art, ICT, Music and Drama, in addition to lessons provided by one of two pathways, including Technology (Cathedral pathway), and Performing Arts (CAPA Juniors Pathway).
Students aged 13+ are required to study for GCSEs in Maths, English (x2), Science (x2 or x3 depending on academic status and/or the pathway they are on). Students can also choose two to three optional subjects to study for GCSE/BTEC qualifications, including options from Dance, Drama, Music, ICT, Finance/Business, Art, Food, Sport and PE.

Ofsted 
The school's latest Ofsted inspection was completed in November 2016, with a final conclusion that the school is in need of improvement. Notably, Ofsted observed that the school isn't able to adequately cater to the needs of children with special needs and/or disabilities, in addition to disadvantaged children. Ofsted concluded that these children are more likely to be underachievers due to this. Ofsted also noted that staff are not adequately trained in order to combat this as an issue.
Separate from this, Ofsted reported that teaching quality between subjects is inconsistent at best, with weaknesses in science and humanities in particular, whereas maths, while improving, is still inconsistent in quality.

Ofsted did note that the acting principal does have a view of what needs to improve, and that the education within the sixth form is top quality and to be viewed as an example. The school has also benefited greatly due to a relationship with Trinity Multi-Academy Trust, which has been crucial for improvements in both teaching and learning.

SIAMS inspection 
The school is Wakefield's only Church of England secondary school and was judged in its Statutory Inspection of Anglican and Methodist Schools (SIAMS) inspection in 2020 to be "Excellent" in both having an effective Christian vision which enables pupils and adults to flourish, and in the impact of collective worship.

Former Headteachers 
 Allan Yellup (2001 - acting). Was also at the same time, headteacher of Wakefield City Academy.
 Paul West (2005–2010)
 Tay Warren (2010–2016)

References

External links 
 Trinity Academy Cathedral website

Schools in Wakefield
Academies in the City of Wakefield
Secondary schools in the City of Wakefield
Church of England secondary schools in the Diocese of Leeds